Jean Carlos de Brito (born 9 June 1995), commonly known as Jean, is a Brazilian footballer who plays as a left back for Swedish club IFK Norrköping. A versatile player, he is also able to play as a central midfielder and as a left winger.

Career

Youth years
Born in Goiânia, Brazil, Jean first started to play youth football with local club Goiás. He also went on to represent Spanish club Osasuna, Palmeiras and Formosa during his youth years.

Brazil
Jean emerged into playing regular first team football in 2017, spending part of the year at CRAC and Paysandu. He featured in the 2017 Copa Verde campaign, where Paysandu finished runners-up following a 4–2 aggregated defeat against Luverdense Esporte Clube in the finals.

He signed with Clube Atlético Tubarão on 10 January 2018, and went on to make a total of 24 appearances for the club in the Série D and the Campeonato Catarinense. Jean also spent three months on loan with the Sport Recife in 2018, failing to make any competitive appearances for the Série A club.

Hammarby IF
On 3 February 2019, Jean transferred to Hammarby IF in Allsvenskan. He signed a three-year deal with the Swedish club for an undisclosed fee. He was sought out as a replacement for countryman Neto Borges, who also had been bought from Tubarão the previous season. However, he had difficulties breaking into the starting eleven and only made 3 appearances for Hammarby during the first half of the season. On 2 August, Jean was loaned out to affiliated club IK Frej in Superettan, Sweden's second division, for the remainder of the year.

Varbergs BoIS
On 26 February 2021, Jean moved to fellow Swedish club Varbergs BoIS, on a three-year contract.

IFK Norrköping
After only a season in Varberg, it was announced by IFK Norrköping in January 2022 that they had signed Jean at a three-year contract.

References

1995 births
Living people
Brazilian footballers
Brazilian expatriate footballers
Association football defenders
Sport Club do Recife players
Clube Atlético Tubarão players
Paysandu Sport Club players
Clube Recreativo e Atlético Catalano players
Campeonato Brasileiro Série B players
Hammarby Fotboll players
IK Frej players
Turun Palloseura footballers
Varbergs BoIS players
IFK Norrköping players
Allsvenskan players
Superettan players
Veikkausliiga players
Expatriate footballers in Sweden
Brazilian expatriate sportspeople in Finland
Sportspeople from Goiânia